"You Lay a Whole Lot of Love on Me" is a song written by Hank Beach and Forest Borders II. It has been recorded by Con Hunley, Tom Jones, Arne Benoni and Shania Twain.

Con Hunley's version was on his 1980 release, I Don't Want to Lose You. "You Lay a Whole Lot of Love on Me" was the album's second single, and reached No. 19 on Billboard's Hot Country Singles chart. Tom Jones's version was on his 1983 album, Don't Let Our Dreams Die Young. Arne Benoni's version was on his album As for You, released 1991.

Shania Twain version
Shania Twain's version was on her self-titled debut album, released in 1993. "You Lay a Whole Lot of Love on Me" was the album's third and final single. The single failed to chart.

Track listing
US 7" single (Mercury 422-862)
"You Lay a Whole Lot of Love On Me"
"God Ain't Gonna Getcha for That"

US Cassette single (Mercury 862 806-4)

Side 1
"You Lay a Whole Lot of Love On Me"
Side 2
"God Ain't Gonna Getcha for That"

Europe CD single (Mercury 862 806-2)
"You Lay a Whole Lot of Love On Me"
"God Ain't Gonna Getcha for That"

Music video
The music video for "You Lay a Whole Lot of Love on Me" was directed by Steven Goldmann and filmed in Montreal, Canada in August 1993, and released in September 1993. The video features Twain performing on a large staircase, intercut with scenes of her and her love interest in various parts of Montreal. The video is available on Twain's DVD The Platinum Collection.

References

Tom Jones (singer) songs
Shania Twain songs
1993 singles
1980 singles
Con Hunley songs
Mercury Records singles
Mercury Nashville singles
Music videos directed by Steven Goldmann
Country ballads
1980 songs